The Csokonai Theatre is the oldest and largest theatre in Debrecen, Hungary. It was named after one of the first Hungarian Modern Age playwrights, Mihály Csokonai, who lived and created many of his works in Debrecen.

Inside, the theatre is richly decorated, and outside are sculptures of Sándor Petőfi, Ferenc Kazinczy, Mihály Vörösmarty, Károly Kisfaludy, Ferenc Kölcsey, and Mihály Csokonai Vitéz, after whom the theatre was named in 1916.

Among the important actors that have performed in the theatre are Lujza Blaha, Kornélia Prielle, Csortos Gyula, Kálmán Rózsahegyi, István Dégi, László Márkus, Zoltán Latinovits, and Géza Hofi.

References

External links 

 

Theatres in Debrecen
Buildings and structures in Debrecen
Tourist attractions in Hungary
Organisations based in Debrecen